Rasoolan hussain (1902 – 15 December 1974) was a leading Indian Hindustani classical music vocal musician.  Belonging to the Benaras gharana, she specialized in the romantic Purab Ang of the Thumri musical genre and tappa.

Early  life and training
Rasoolan Hussain was born in 1902 at Kachhwa Baazar, Mirzapur, Uttar Pradesh, in a poor family, though she inherited the musical legacy of her mother Adalat, and displayed her grasp over classical Ragas at an early age. Recognising this at the age of five, she was sent to learn music from Ustad Shammu Khan, and later from sarangiyas (sarangi players) Ashiq Khan and Ustad Najju Khan.

Career
Rasoolanbai became an expert in Tappa singing as well as Purab Ang, Thumri, besides dadra, poorbi geet, hori, kajri and chaiti. Her first performance was held in Dhananjaygarh court, after its success she started getting invitations from local Rajas of the time, thus she went on to dominated the Hindustani classical music genre for next five decades, based in Varanasi and became the doyenne of Benaras gharana. In 1948, she stopped performing mujra and moved out of her kotha, started living in a bylane of Varanasi (Banaras) and married a local Banarasi sari dealer.

A contemporary of Siddheswari Devi (1908–1976) also from the same gharana,  besides, concerts and mehfils, she often sang on Lucknow and Allahabad stations of All India Radio  and Doordarshan till 1972, and her last public singing was held in Kashmir.

She was awarded the Sangeet Natak Akademi Award in Hindustani music Vocal in 1957 by Sangeet Natak Akademi, India's National Academy of Music, Dance and Theatre. Despite an illustrious musical career, she died in penury, running a small tea shop next to the radio station where she had often broadcast from. She has also taught noted classical singer Nainna Devi.

Her house was burnt during 1969 communal riots in the city. She died on 15 December 1974, at the age of 72.
Rasoolan Bai and the tawaif or courtesan tradition of women musicians was featured in the film The Other Song (2009) by Saba Dewan, also featuring her more famous song, Lagat karejwa ma chot, phool gendwa na maar, a 1935 Gramophone recording

Awards
 1957: Sangeet Natak Akademi Award:  Vocal

References

External links
 Rasoolan Bai Biography and Music at Last.fm

1902 births
1974 deaths
People from Mirzapur district
Hindustani singers
Recipients of the Sangeet Natak Akademi Award
Thumri
Indian women classical singers
Musicians from Varanasi
20th-century Indian singers
Women Hindustani musicians
Singers from Uttar Pradesh
20th-century Indian women singers
Women musicians from Uttar Pradesh